The 2009 Georgia Bulldogs football team represented the University of Georgia in the 2009 NCAA Division I FBS football season. The Bulldogs competed in the East Division of the Southeastern Conference (SEC). This was the Georgia Bulldogs' ninth season under head coach Mark Richt. The Bulldogs finished the season 8–5, 4–4 in SEC play and won the Independence Bowl, 44–20, against Texas A&M.

Schedule

Rankings

References

Georgia
Georgia Bulldogs football seasons
Independence Bowl champion seasons
Georgia Bulldogs football